is a Japanese manga artist. She is best known for her manga works Sumomomo, Momomo and Magi: The Labyrinth of Magic.

Works

Publication
Sumomomo, Momomo (2004–2009) — Serialized in Square Enix's Young Gangan.
Magi: The Labyrinth of Magic (2009–2017) — Serialized in Shogakukan's Weekly Shōnen Sunday.
Magi: Adventure of Sinbad (illustrated by Yoshifumi Ohtera; 2013–2018) — Serialized in Shogakukan's Weekly Shōnen Sunday and later in Ura Sunday.
Orient (2018–present) — Serialized in Kodansha's Weekly Shōnen Magazine and later in Bessatsu Shōnen Magazine.

Anime
Back Arrow (2021) — Original character designs.

References

External links
 Shinobu Ohtaka's Backstage section at Web Sunday 
 Shinobu Ohtaka at Media Arts Database 
 

1983 births
Female comics writers
Japanese female comics artists
Living people
Manga artists from Tokyo
Women manga artists